Mishkeh may refer to:
 Mishkeh, Gilan
 Mishkeh, Khuzestan